Iran Taekwondo Association "I.T.A" (Persian: کانون تکواندوکاران ایران) is the First N.G.O & Non-governmental Federation of Iran sport which started its activities with the official authority of Iran's Interior Ministry and Justice Ministry in 2001.

This organization has not only established the first Taekwondo schools in Iran, but also trained many Taekwondo official coaches and referees.

It has held many competitions in different age groups, from infants to teenagers, youngsters and adults.

Ali Haghshenas is the founder and chairman of this organization.

Javad Moshiri (Vice President), Munir Ghasemzadeh (Women Vice President), Mohammad Abdalipour (Secretary General), Mehran Khalili (Secretary of the Technical Council), Mehdi Ghasemi (Inspector), Jafar Sharifi (Executive Committee Chairman) and Dawood Sertipi (Youth Branch Chief) are among the Managers of this Federation.

Government oppositions 
The Iran Physical Education Organization - Ministry of Sport and Iran Taekwondo Governmental Federation are two organizations which are opposed the activities of the I.T.A. This opposition has been declared from the early establishment of the I.T.A.

MohammadReza Poladgar (Former head of Iran Taekwondo State Federation & The current Deputy Minister of Sports of the Islamic Republic of Iran), including the lower, middle and senior levels of the physical education organization, joined against this organization and by asking other government bodies, he formed and organized an unprecedented government consensus against the Iran Taekwondo Association.

As a result, the organization of physical education announced its stance and opposition to the activities of this trade-specialized organization.

These oppositions from the beginning of the foundation and announcement of the existence of the Iranian Taekwondo Association in 2001 in various ways, including trying to prevent the participation of the delegation teams of the association in international tournaments (previously in the Dutch tournament), trying to destroy the image of this institution and its managers in the public opinion with One-sided presence on Iran's state radio-television, issuance of numerous directives and instructions to the state sports departments of the provinces by the physical education organization and to the state taekwondo delegations of the cities by the state taekwondo federation have been expressed.

Ali Haghshenas, The President of the Iran Taekwondo Association complained to the court against  President of Iran Taekwondo Governmental Federation (Mohammad Poladgar) and condemned him.

But in the end, Poladgar was acquitted by the verdict of the Judicial system of the Islamic Republic of Iran.

Scientific activities
 Among the scientific activities of the Association, the following can be mentioned:
 Holding Specialized Scientific Seminars on the Development of Taekwondo in Iran.
 Writing and publishing of Scientific, Reference and Academic Books:
 The Martial Arts Encyclopedia: The First Martial Arts Encyclopedia in Iran, By: Ali Haghshenas (The President of I-T-A), Published in 2016, Iran, Tehran (The Fifth Edition -2023).
 The TopTaekwondo Doctrine: Taekwondo free style of the world,  By: Ali Haghshenas (The President of I-T-A), Published in 2020, Iran, Tehran (The Third Edition -2023),
 The Pathology of Martial Arts: The First Persian Source of Pathology of Martial Arts, By: Ali Haghshenas (The President of I-T-A), Published in 2022, Iran, Tehran (The Second Edition -2023)

 Taekwondo Physiology: The First Taekwondo Physiology Reference Book in Iran,  By: Ali Haghshenas (The President of I-T-A), Published in 2022, Iran, Tehran (The Second Edition -2023).
 The Martial Arts & Its Graet Founders,  By: Hamidreza Tavakoul Shoar (The board member of I-T-A), Published in 2015, Iran, Tehran (The Fifth Edition - 2018)
 The TopTaekwondo, Kickboxing and Muay Thai, By: Javad Moshiri (The Vice President of I-T-A), Published in 2022, Iran, Tehran.
 The Tang Soo Do, Kuk Sool Won and Hapkido, By: Mehran Khalili Manesh (GS of the Technical Council and Vice President of Korean Styles of the I-T-A), Published in 2022, Iran, Tehran.
 Self-defense training in hand-to-hand combat, By: Mehran Khalili Manesh (GS of the Technical Council and Vice President of Korean Styles of the I-T-A), Published in 2022, Iran, Tehran.

References

External links
Fars News Agency 
BBC Persian
Iran Newspaper

Sports organizations established in 1984
Taekwondo organizations
1984 establishments in Iran
Taekwondo